OKARMO Corner is a monument showing the tripoint of Oklahoma, Arkansas and Missouri. It is located at an elevation of 1,049 feet and is located near Southwest City, Missouri.

See also 
 Tripoint
 List of Oklahoma tri-points

References

External links
 The OKARMO Corner

Border tripoints
Borders of Oklahoma
Borders of Arkansas
Borders of Missouri
Boundary markers